Events from the year 1984 in Scotland.

Incumbents 

 Secretary of State for Scotland and Keeper of the Great Seal – George Younger

Law officers 
 Lord Advocate – Lord Mackay of Clashfern; then Lord Cameron of Lochbroom
 Solicitor General for Scotland – Peter Fraser

Judiciary 
 Lord President of the Court of Session and Lord Justice General – Lord Emslie
 Lord Justice Clerk – Lord Wheatley
 Chairman of the Scottish Land Court – Lord Elliott

Events 
 12 March – 1984/5 Miner's Strike: Polmaise Colliery is the first mine in Scotland to witness a walkout of its workers.
 16 April – Culmination of the Glasgow Ice Cream Wars with the murder by arson of six members of the Doyle family.
 3 May – 1984/5 miner's strike: Nearly 300 miners are arrested outside Ravenscraig in clashes with police as they try to stop lorries laden with coal entering.
 14 June – Elections to the European Parliament result in Labour gaining three seats from the Conservatives to win 5 of the 8 seats in Scotland, with the Conservatives reduced to two and the SNP retaining the one they previously held.
 30 July – Polmont rail accident at Polmont, near Falkirk, when an express train from Edinburgh to Glasgow, travelling at high speed, strikes a cow on the track near Polmont station, derailing several carriages and resulting in thirteen deaths and 61 injuries.
 8 August – Official opening of Kylesku Bridge, replacing a ferry.
 August – Hutton oilfield production begins in the East Shetland Basin.
 Kellas cat identified as a hybrid.
 Undated
Puppet Animation Scotland organization is founded.

Births 
 17 January – Calvin Harris, born Adam Richard Wiles, pop singer-songwriter, record producer and DJ
 27 February – Catriona Forrest, field hockey player
 12 March – Neil Fachie, para-cyclist
 8 May – Martin Compston, screen actor and footballer
 5 September – Alison Bell, field hockey player
 8 September – Finlay Wild, fell runner
 25 October – Adam MacKenzie, field hockey defender
 30 November – Alan Hutton, footballer

Deaths 
 28 March – Jimmy McGowan, footballer (born 1924)
 15 April – Alexander Trocchi, writer (born 1925)
 6 September – Donny MacLeod, TV presenter (born 1932; heart attack)
 11 October – Benno Schotz, sculptor (born 1891 in Germany)
 date unknown
Jean Bain of Crathie, Aberdeenshire, last speaker of Deeside Gaelic (born Jean McDonald, 1890)
George Campbell Hay, poet (born 1915)

The arts
 16 February – Iain Banks' first novel The Wasp Factory is published.
 Robert Alan Jamieson's novel Soor Hearts is published.
 James Kelman's first (published) novel The Busconductor Hines is published in Edinburgh.
 Scottish Poetry Library established.

See also 
 1984 in Northern Ireland

References 

 
Scotland
Years of the 20th century in Scotland
1980s in Scotland